Ecuador–Malaysia relations are foreign relations between Ecuador and Malaysia. Ecuador has an embassy in Kuala Lumpur, while Malaysia has an honorary consul in Quito that is supervised by Malaysian embassy in Santiago. Both countries are members of the Non-Aligned Movement.

History 

Diplomatic relations between the two countries have been established since 1994, since that the relations are described as "very friendly". The relations are mainly in the economic bilateral relations. In 2014, Ecuadorian Foreign Minister Ricardo Patiño concluded his first official visit to Malaysia with both began to increase their economic partnership in bilateral relations. A memorandum of understanding (MoU) was also signed during the meeting.

Economic relations 
In 2012, the total trade between the countries worth around $142.20 billion with Ecuadorian exports of $22.29 million and imports from Malaysia with $119.91 million. The main Ecuadorian export to Malaysia such as cocoa beans, coffee and seafood while the main imports from Malaysia are mainly semi-conductors and electronic conductors. Several Memorandum of Understanding (MoU) has been signed by both countries to enhance the economic relations. Other than that, an agreement between the Port Klang Authority and the Port Authority of Manta which could connect the ASEAN countries to the South American markets through Ecuador has been signed including an agreement on innovation and technology transfer. The Government of Ecuador also interested on the Malaysian investments in the palm oil sector with one of the Malaysian company, Sime Darby is looking a possibilities to investing in Ecuador. In the education sector, Ecuador has offered The National University of Malaysia (UKM) to participate in a ground-breaking educational project at a new visionary city in the South American country and the country has requested Malaysian institutions of higher learning to take part in the transformation of Ecuador's economy. Furthermore, Malaysia also has funded a monorail project in Rumiñahui and was committed to strengthening bilateral relationship with Ecuador through the realisation of co-operation programs and boosting financing on infrastructure projects in Ecuador.

Further reading 
  Negocios y comercio en Ecuador y Malasia: Análisis comparativo de los procesos de emprendimiento y exportación; recomendaciones para el Ecuador Centro de Estudios Asia-Pacífico
 Ambassador of Ecuador gives conference about ALBA-TCP at the Ministry of Foreign Affairs of Malaysia Ministerio de Relaciones Exteriores y Movilidad Humana (Ecuador)

References 

 
Malaysia
Bilateral relations of Malaysia